Trinidad and Tobago competed at the 2018 Commonwealth Games in the Gold Coast, Australia from April 4 to April 15, 2018.

Track and field athlete Michelle-Lee Ahye was the country's flag bearer during the opening ceremony.

Medalists

Competitors
The following is the list of number of competitors participating at the Games per sport/discipline.

Athletics

Trinidad and Tobago participated with 24 athletes (13 men and 11 women).

Men
Track & road events

* Competed in heats only.

Field events

Women
Track & road events

Field events

Badminton

Trinidad and Tobago participated with two athletes (two men)

Beach volleyball

Trinidad and Tobago qualified a men's and women's beach volleyball team for a total of four athletes.

Boxing

Trinidad and Tobago participated with a team of 2 athletes (2 men).

Men

Cycling

Trinidad and Tobago participated with 4 athletes (4 men).

Track
Sprint

Keirin

Time trial

Gymnastics

Artistic
Trinidad and Tobago participated with 1 athlete (1 man).

Men
Team Final & Individual Qualification

Shooting

Trinidad and Tobago participated with 5 athletes (5 men).

Men

Open

Squash

Trinidad and Tobago participated with 3 athletes (2 men and 1 woman).

Individual

Doubles

Swimming

Trinidad and Tobago participated with 1 athlete (1 man).

Men

Table tennis

Trinidad and Tobago participated with 4 athletes (3 men and 1 woman).

Singles

Doubles

Team

Triathlon

Trinidad and Tobago participated with 1 athlete (1 woman).

Individual

References

Nations at the 2018 Commonwealth Games
Trinidad and Tobago at the Commonwealth Games
2018 in Trinidad and Tobago sport